The buff-barred warbler (Phylloscopus pulcher) is a species of leaf warbler (family Phylloscopidae). It was formerly included in the "Old World warbler" assemblage.

It is found in Bhutan, China, India, Laos, Myanmar, Nepal, Thailand, and Vietnam. Its natural habitats are boreal forests and temperate forests.

References

buff-barred warbler
Birds of North India
Birds of Nepal
Birds of Eastern Himalaya
Birds of Central China
Birds of Yunnan
buff-barred warbler
buff-barred warbler
Taxonomy articles created by Polbot